Montivipera kuhrangica, commonly known as the Kuhrang mountain viper, is a species of viper endemic to Iran. Like all other vipers, it is venomous.

Geographic range
The snake is found in Chaharmahal and Bakhtiari Province, Iran in the Zagros Mountains.

References 

Reptiles described in 2011
Reptiles of Iran
kuhrangica